Chris Wylde (born Chris Noll, August 22, 1976) is an American actor from New Jersey.

Wylde is best known for his roles in  the films The DUFF, Space Cowboys, the 2009 horror film The Revenant, the 2017 horror comedy The Babysitter and its 2020 sequel The Babysitter: Killer Queen. He had his own show on Comedy Central and has guest starred on numerous shows on the Disney Channel. Wylde created, writes, produces and stars in the web series Dadholes. He has recurring roles on Young Sheldon as Glenn the owner of the comic book store and The Cuphead Show! as Ribby.

Personal life
Wylde was born in Hackettstown and grew up in Belvidere, Verona, and Allendale, New Jersey. Both Wylde's parents were Methodist ministers. Wylde attended American University.

Wylde is a Los Angeles Clippers fan, and met his wife at a Clippers game. Since 2012 Wylde hosts ClipCast with Henry Dittman, the longest running Clippers podcast.

Career 
While living in Washington D.C. and attending A.U. he starred in the PBS series Standard Deviants.

After graduating college Chris moved to Hollywood. He began his television career on the Comedy Central show Strip Mall with fellow comedians Julie Brown and Victoria Jackson, followed by the network's first late-night talk show, The Chris Wylde Show starring Chris Wylde.

Wylde went on to appear in television guest roles, notably pranking the judges on American Idol with his "Rapping Nanny" character (under his given name, Christopher Noll).

Wylde had minor roles in films such as Space Cowboys, Joe Dirt and Coyote Ugly. He later starred in the horror film The Revenant (2009) and The DUFF.

Chris Wylde has a recurring role on Young Sheldon as Glenn, the owner of the comic book store.

Wylde also writes, produces and stars in the web series Dadholes.

Filmography

Film

Television

References

External links

American male film actors
Living people
American University alumni
People from Belvidere, New Jersey
People from Verona, New Jersey
People from Allendale, New Jersey
American male television actors
1976 births